Edmund Uvedale (died 1621), of Little Crichel, Dorset, was an English politician.

He was a Member of Parliament (MP) for Corfe Castle in 1572.

References

16th-century births
1621 deaths
Politicians from Dorset
English MPs 1572–1583